"Special Brew" is a song by British 2-tone and ska band Bad Manners, released in September 1980 and was the third single from their first album Ska 'n' B. It was the band's joint biggest hit in the UK, reaching number 3 in the UK Singles Chart, where it stayed for two weeks. The song takes its inspiration from the Carlsberg lager Special Brew and is about someone who loves it like a significant other. 

After the success of "Ne-Ne Na-Na Na-Na Nu-Nu", the band realised they needed to write more songs and so went to the local off-licence for inspiration. One of the ideas sounded "a bit soppy... a bit of a long song" to Buster Bloodvessel, which was not their style, so he picked up his beer and sang "I love you, yes i do 'cause i know that you're my special brew" and the song was then written in a matter of minutes.

The B-side song "Ivor The Engine" is named after the eponymous television series and was included on their second album Loonee Tunes!, titled "The Undersea Adventures of Ivor the Engine".

A limited-edition picture disc was also issued, with a picture of Bloodvessel licking his lips at a pint of Special Brew.

Track listing
7"
 "Special Brew" – 3:20
 "Ivor The Engine" – 2:25

Charts

Weekly charts

Year-end charts

References

1980 singles
1980 songs
Magnet Records singles
Songs about alcohol
Bad Manners songs